The Damascus Document is an ancient Hebrew text known from both the Cairo Geniza and the Dead Sea Scrolls. It is considered one of the foundational documents of the ancient Jewish community of Qumran.

The redactor of the text allows that the covenant is open to all Israelites who accept the sect's halakha, while condemning the others as the "wicked of Judah" against whom God would direct "a great anger with flames of fire by the hand of all the angels of destruction against persons turning aside from the path". The text states that those who abandon the true covenant "will not live".

Some scholars suggest it serves as a "bridge" document, connecting Judaism's post-exilic 'Enochian'-Essene majority to the asserted leadership of its radical minority Qumran–Essene community that was established in isolation near the shores of the Dead Sea.

The Damascus Document is a fragmentary text, no complete version of which survives. There have been attempts to reconstruct the original text from the various fragments. The medieval recension appears to have been shorter than the Qumran version, but where they overlap there is little divergence. The correct ordering of all the Qumran fragments is not certain.

Name
The fragments found in Cairo in 1897 were originally called the Zadokite Fragments but after the work was found at Qumran, the name was changed because the document had numerous references to Damascus. The way this Damascus is treated in the document makes it possible that it was not a literal reference to Damascus in Syria, but to be understood either geographically for Babylon or Qumran itself. If symbolic, it is probably taking up the Biblical language found in Amos 5:27, "therefore I shall take you into exile beyond Damascus"; Damascus was part of Israel under King David, and the Damascus Document expresses an eschatological hope of the restoration of a Davidic monarchy.

Discovery
Two manuscripts (CDa and CDb) were found in Cairo, with further findings at Qumran. In contrast to the fragments found at Qumran, the CD documents are largely complete, and therefore are vital for reconstructing the text.

Cairo Geniza
The main fragments were discovered by Solomon Schechter in 1897 in the Cairo Geniza, a storeroom adjoining Ben Ezra Synagogue in Fustat (Old Cairo), among over 190,000 manuscripts and fragments that were written in mainly Hebrew and Judaeo-Arabic. The fragments were quite large, and a number of them matched documents found later in Qumran. They were divided into two separate sections, CDa, and CDb. Schechter dated CDa to the 10th century C.E and CDb to 11th or 12th century C.E. These fragments are housed at the Cambridge University Library with the classmarks T-S 10K6 and T-S 16.311 (other references are CDa and CDb).

Qumran scrolls
The fragments from Qumran have been assigned the document references 4Q266-73 (see photo of 4Q271), 5Q12, and 6Q15.

Structure
The combined text of CDa and CDb contains twenty columns of writing. As it has come down to us, two columns have been mislocated: columns 15 & 16 originally preceded col 9. Fragments of this text from Qumran include material not found in CD.

The Damascus Document can be divided into two separate sections, commonly called Admonition and Laws. Davies divides the Admonition into four sections: History, Legal, Warnings, a Supplement (which Wise refers to as exhortations). The Admonition comprises moral instruction, exhortation, and warning addressed to members of the sect, together with polemic against its opponents; it serves as a kind of introduction to the second section.

The Laws looks at this new covenant community expressed to them through the Teacher of Righteousness. It goes into great detail of the different social arrangements that were taking place at the time. The Laws feature Oaths & vows, Sundry rulings (halakhot), Camp laws, and a fragment of Penal codes (more of which were found in the Qumran fragments).

The Admonition
This part is divided into four subsections.

A. Admonition (columns 1–8 + 19–20)

1. History (1.1–4.12a)
Background to the community
A description of the community and how they originated, with their purpose and an appeal to join them.

2. Legal (4.12b–7.9)
The significance of being outside and inside the community, some of the laws
The position of people in and outside the community in regard to the law. Those outside are straying from the law, while their community is based on the law, which is strict, but offers salvation.

3. Warnings (7.5–8.19)
Includes the Three Nets of Belial 
Expands on the original Admonition. Criticises of the "princes of Judah", i.e. the mainstream religious authorities.

4. Supplement or exhortations (19.33–20.34)
Discusses apostasy, disobedience, further warnings and a promise to the faithful
Further expansion of the Admonition. A new group with a Teacher appears, calling themselves the "new covenant". Davies identifies them with the Qumran group.

The Laws
The first 12 laws are from the Damascus Document found at Qumran, while the others are from the Cairo Geniza.

B. Laws (columns 15-16 + 9-14)

1. Oaths and vows (15.1–9.10a)
Taking oaths, becoming a member of the community, offerings and vows to God

2. Sundry rulings (9.10b–12.22a)
Rules regarding witnesses, purity and purification, the Sabbath, sacrifices, gentiles and impure foods

3. Camp laws (12.22b–14.18a)
Laws for life in the camp, qualification for an overseer, relations with outsiders, ranks and needs of camp members

4. Penal code (14.18b–22)
Fragment concerning punishments

Another way to organise the laws would be:
 Introduction: the new laws, priests, and overseer
 Rules about priests and disqualification
 Diagnosis of skin disease
 Impurity from menstruation and childbirth
 Levitical laws pertaining to harvest
 Gleanings from grapes and olives
 Fruits of the fourth year
 Measures and Tithes
 Impurity of Idolators metal, corpse impurity, and sprinkling
 Wife suspected of adultery
 Integrity with commercial dealings and marriage
 Overseer of the camp
 15.1–15a: Oath to return to the law of Moses be those joining the covenant
 15.15b–20: Exclusion from the community on the basis of a physical defect
 16.1–20: Oath to enter the community, as well as laws concerning the taking of other oaths and vows
 9.1: Death to the one responsible for the death of a Jew using gentile courts of justice
 9.2–8: Laws about reproof and vengeance
 9.9–10.10a: Laws about oaths, lost articles and testimony and judges
 10.10b–13 Purification in water
 10.14–11.18 Regulations for keeping the Sabbath
 11.19–12.2a Laws for keeping the purity of the Temple
 12.2b–6a Dealing with transgressors
 12.6b–11a Relations with gentiles
 12.11b–15a Dietary laws
 12.15b–22a Two purity rules
 12.22b–14.19 Regulations for those in the camps
 14.20–22 Penal code dealing with infractions of communal discipline
 Expulsion ceremony

CD and the Community Rule
The document contains prominent reference to a cryptic figure called the Teacher of Righteousness, whom some of the other Qumran scrolls treat as a figure from their past, and others treat as a figure in their present, and others still as a figure of the future. (Some of these other scrolls where he is mentioned are the Pesharim on Habakkuk (numerous times), Micah (once) and Psalms, as well as 4Q172.) The document introduces the group led by the Teacher as having arisen 390 years after the first fall of Jerusalem (circa 200 BCE): "And God observed their deeds, that they sought Him with a whole heart, and He raised for them a Teacher of Righteousness to guide them in the way of His heart." On the basis of that reference, historians date the Teacher to circa 150 BCE. Scholars have also believed that he was a priest based on other variations in the text that are also thought to be him. These include: "the teacher", "the unique teacher" and "the interpreter of the law".

This Teacher of Righteousness does not feature at all, however, in the Community Rule, another document found amongst the Qumran scrolls. To some scholars, this suggests that the two works are of different Second Temple groups. Most scholars, however, focus on the high degree of shared terminology and legal rulings between the Damascus Document and the Community Rule, including terms like sons of light, and their penal codes and on the likelihood that fragment 4Q265 is a hybrid edition of both documents. They turn to the fact that the Damascus Document describes the group amongst whom the Document was created as having been leaderless for 20 years before the Teacher of Righteousness established his rule over the group to explain that both works are from the same group under different situations.

Within this approach of the majority of scholars, the textual relationship between the Damascus Document and Community Rule is not completely resolved, though there is a general agreement that they have some evolutionary connection. Some suspect that the Community Rule is the original text that was later altered to become the Damascus Document, others that the Damascus Document was redacted to become the Community Rule, a third group argues that the Community Rule was created as a utopian ideal rather than a practical replacement for the Damascus Document, and still others that believe the Community Rule and Damascus Document were written for different types of communities, one enclosed and the other open.

Notes

References

Bibliography
 Boccaccini, Gabriele: Beyond the Essene Hypothesis: The Parting of the Ways between Qumran and Enochic Judaism. (Grand Rapids, Michigan: Eerdmans, 1998) 
 Broshi, Magen: The Damascus document reconsidered (Israel Exploration Society: Shrine of the Book, Israel Museum, 1992)
 Davies, P. R.: The Damascus covenant: an interpretation of the "Damascus document" (Sheffield: JSOT Press, 1983; Journal for the Study of the Old Testament, Supplement series 25)
 Davila, James R.: "The Damascus Document and the Community Rule" (University of St. Andrews,2005)
 Ginzberg, L.: An Unknown Jewish Sect (New York: Jewish Theological Seminary of America, 1976, ©1970); translated and expanded from Eine unbekannte jüdische Sekte (New York: Hildesheim, 1922, privately published)
 Hempel, Charlotte: The Damascus Texts (Sheffield: Sheffield Academic Press, 2000) 
 Kahle, Paul: The Cairo Genizah (Oxford: Blackwell, 1959)
 Rabin, C.: The Zadokite documents, 1: the admonition, 2: the laws (2nd ed. Oxford, 1958)
 Reif, Stefan: Article "Cairo Genizah", in Encyclopaedia of the Dead Sea Scrolls, Vol.1, ed LH Schiffman and JC VanderKam (Oxford: OUP: 2000) 
 Rowley, H. H.: The Zadokite fragments and the Dead Sea scrolls (Oxford: Blackwell, 1952)
 Schechter, S.: Documents of Jewish sectaries/ edited from Hebrew MSS. in the Cairo Genizah collection, now in the possession of the University Library, Cambridge (Cambridge: University Press, 1910) 2 v
 Smith, Barry: The Dead Sea Scrolls, Crandall University course 
 Zeitlin, Solomon: The Zadokite fragments: facsimile of the manuscripts in the Cairo Genizah collection in the possession of the University Library, Cambridge, England (Philadelphia: Dropsie College, 1952)
 No author. The book of Damascus
 The Taylor-Schechter Genizah Collection website, by the dedicated research unit (Cambridge University)

External links
 Full text of the Damascus Document

Dead Sea Scrolls
Essene texts
Hebrew manuscripts
Jewish manuscripts